Mipham Wangpo (1641–1717) was considered to be the immediate re-incarnation of Gyalwang Pagsam Wangpo and the sixth Gyalwang Drukchen hierarch of the Northern branch of the Drukpa Kagyu tradition of Tibetan Buddhism.

He was born at Phoding in Lhodrak, Kharchu district of southern Tibet and recognized by the 5th Dalai Lama as the Omniscient Drukchen incarnation. He spent most of his formative years at Lhasa in the Potala Palace of the Dalai Lama and studying at the monastic colleges of Sera, Drepung, and Gaden.

Mipham Wangpo was an influential figure in settling the Ladakh-Tibet war of 1679–1684.

Alternate Names
 Mipham Wangpo (mi pham dbang po)
 Mipham Ngakgi Wangchuck (mi pham ngag gi dbang phyug)
.

References

Sources

External links
  Mipham Wangpo
  TBRC P940

1654 births
1717 deaths
17th-century Tibetan people
18th-century Tibetan people
Gyalwang Drukpas